The 2021 Letran Knights men's basketball team represented Colegio de San Juan de Letran in the 97th season of the National Collegiate Athletic Association in the Philippines. The men's basketball tournament for the school year 2021-22 began in the second semester on March 26, 2022, and the host school for the season is De La Salle–College of Saint Benilde.

The Knights competed in the NCAA after more than two years since their historic championship run in 2019, and since the COVID-19 pandemic in the Philippines.

The Knights, the Season 95 champions, started the season by winning against season's hosts CSB Blazers in a game played via bubble setting. They  swept the single round-robin eliminations, finishing at first place with 9 wins against no losses.

The Knights then survive the gritty fourth-seeded UPHSD Altas in the Final Four and made it back to the NCAA men's basketball Finals. The last time Letran made back-to-back Finals was in 2012 to 2013 seasons.

The Knights went on to defeat the Mapúa Cardinals in two games to capture their 19th championship, clinching their first back-to-back titles since winning in 1998 & 1999 seasons, and sweeping the whole tournament since 1984. Team captain Jeo Ambohot was named Finals Most Valuable Player, Mythical Five member, and All-Defensive team member, while Rhenz Abando bagged Season Most Valuable Player, Rookie of the Year, and was also named in the Mythical Five.

Roster 

 Depth chart Depth chart

Roster changes 
The Knights lost five of its key players from the 2019 championship team. Jerrick Balanza, Larry Muyang, Edson Batiller, and Christian Balagasay were drafted last 2019 in the Philippine Basketball Association, while Ato Ular is now playing in FilBasket as a pro.

Christian Fajarito, who last played for Letran in 2018, returned in the roster. The Knights also welcomed its two blue chip transferees from the University of Santo Tomas, Rhenz Abando and Brent Paraiso.

Suspensions 
Letran big man Louie Sangalang served a one-game suspension after he was slapped with a disqualifying foul for throwing the ball to the face of Mapúa Cardinals counterpart Warren Bonifacio during their matchup in the elimination round.

Injuries 
Letran star Rhenz Abando suffered a left ankle sprain after a putback dunk that led to a bad fall during their Finals Game 1 matchup against the Mapúa Cardinals. He played the following game and led his team to a championship.

NCAA Season 97 games results 

Elimination games are played in a single round-robin format. All games are aired on GTV and GMA Pinoy TV, and streamed online live via the NCAA Philippines website, NCAA Philippines Facebook page and YouTube channel, and GMA Sports’ Facebook and Twitter pages.

Source: Pong Ducanes, Imperium Technology

Awards

References 

2021–22 in Philippine college basketball
Letran Knights basketball team seasons